Rocchetta di Vara is a comune (municipality) in the Province of La Spezia in the Italian region Liguria, located about  southeast of Genoa and about  north of La Spezia.

Rocchetta di Vara borders the following municipalities: Beverino, Borghetto di Vara, Brugnato, Calice al Cornoviglio, Mulazzo, Zeri, Zignago.

References

Cities and towns in Liguria